Cyrus Console (Cyrus Console-Şoican) is an American poet, essayist, and memoirist from Topeka, Kansas. Console studied biology as an undergraduate at the University of Kansas. He also earned an MFA in writing from the Milton Avery Graduate School of the Arts at Bard College and a PhD in literature and creative writing from the University of Kansas. His first book of poetry, Brief Under Water, was published in 2008, and his second book of poetry, The Odicy, appeared in 2011. A memoir, Romanian Notebook, was published in March 2017 by Farrar, Straus and Giroux. Console is currently an assistant professor at the Kansas City Art Institute.

Bibliography

Further reading 
 "The Matter With Kansas: Ben Lerner Talks to Cyrus Console," Los Angeles Review of Books, February 26, 2012,

References

21st-century American poets
American male poets
Bard College alumni
Kansas City Art Institute faculty
People from Topeka, Kansas
Poets from Kansas
University of Kansas alumni
Writers from Kansas
Writers from Topeka, Kansas
21st-century American male writers
Year of birth missing (living people)
Living people